Mount Moffatt is a rural locality in the Maranoa Region, Queensland, Australia.

Mount Moffatt's postcode is 4465.

History 
The locality was initially called Mount Moffatt, but changed to Mount Moffatt on 18 October 2002. It is presumably named after the mountain Mount Moffatt within the locality.

References 

Maranoa Region
Localities in Queensland